Ion Duminicel (born 15 August 1954) is a Romanian bobsledder. He competed at the 1980 Winter Olympics and the 1984 Winter Olympics.

References

1954 births
Living people
Romanian male bobsledders
Olympic bobsledders of Romania
Bobsledders at the 1980 Winter Olympics
Bobsledders at the 1984 Winter Olympics
People from Călimănești